Titanio hyrcanella is a moth in the family Crambidae. It was described by Hans Georg Amsel in 1950 and is found in Iran.

References

Moths described in 1950
Odontiini
Taxa named by Hans Georg Amsel